Kazichene Cove is a 2.2 km wide cove on the southeast side of Osmar Strait indenting for 1.3 km the northwest coast of Low Island in the South Shetland Islands, Antarctica. It is esouth of Lyutibrod Rocks and Fernandez Point, and north of Solnik Point.

The cove is named after the settlement of Kazichene in western Bulgaria.

Location
British mapping in 2009.

Maps
 South Shetland Islands: Smith and Low Islands. Scale 1:150000 topographic map No. 13677. British Antarctic Survey, 2009.
 Antarctic Digital Database (ADD). Scale 1:250000 topographic map of Antarctica. Scientific Committee on Antarctic Research (SCAR). Since 1993, regularly upgraded and updated.

References
 Kazichene Cove. SCAR Composite Gazetteer of Antarctica.
 Bulgarian Antarctic Gazetteer. Antarctic Place-names Commission. (details in Bulgarian, basic data in English)

External links
 Kazichene Cove. Copernix satellite image

Coves of the South Shetland Islands
Bulgaria and the Antarctic